Lucy May Cranwell  (7 August 1907 – 8 June 2000) was a New Zealand botanist responsible for groundbreaking work in palynology. Cranwell was appointed curator of botany at Auckland Museum in 1929, when she was 21 years old. As well as her work on ancient pollen samples she was responsible for encouraging a love of botany in a generation of Auckland children.

Early life and education
Cranwell was born in Auckland, New Zealand in 1907. She grew up in Henderson, on an orchard at the conjunction of the Opanuku and Oratia streams. She was strongly influenced by her conservation-minded and artistic mother. It has been suggested that Cranwell inherited the unpredictable aspects of her fearless and adventuresome spirit from her mother's Cornish roots. Her father was a trained nurseryman who had planted an extensive orchard in the family property. She attended Henderson public school and then Epsom Girls Grammar School. She entered the University of Auckland in 1925 where she undertook an initial BA degree that was a mixture of English and Botany, followed by a masters in Botany with a thesis on the epiphytes of the Waitākere Ranges. She graduated in 1929.

During her university studies she developed a love of tramping and gained a reputation as the strongest, fastest walker in the University Field Club. Her love of the New Zealand wilderness stood her in good stead for the many botany field trips she began to embark on, most often with fellow botany student and friend Lucy Moore, to various remote and inaccessible parts of the country.

Auckland Museum

In April 1929, a few weeks after graduating, the director of the Auckland Museum, Dr Gilbert Edward Archey, offered Cranwell the inaugural Botany Curator position. The museum was due to open in its new, much larger, war memorial building in November of that year and its halls were in need of filling with displays. "Everything had to be done on a shoestring, alas, and there was no artist to help make the cases look seductive for man, woman, or child. People did not seem to take notice, however. Dr Archey had stressed that we were to consider ourselves the servants of the public; we were to welcome enquiries of all kinds," wrote Cranwell of those first few months in the job.

As well as finding botanical specimens for display she also set about organising the Cheeseman herbarium of about 10,000 specimens. During her 14 years as botany curator she introduced "botany trots" for children to places like Rangitoto Island in the Hauraki Gulf, wrote weekly short articles for children about plants for the Auckland Star newspaper, and collected over 4000 plants for the herbarium during her 14 years as the botanist.

Field work

Cranwell's field work was among the first and certainly the most extensive undertaken by a woman scientist in New Zealand. These included trips into the pristine, ancient podocarp forests of the King Country looking for root parasites, various trips to Te Moehau peak on the tip of the Coromandel peninsula where she documented the unique alpine flora found there, and several visits to Maungapohatu in Te Urewera. She also undertook a study of marine algae of New Zealand's northern islands (a green and a red algae are named after her), surveys of Auckland Harbour and its west coast between Muriwai and Piha, as well as several trips to take fossil pollen samples from South Island bogs.

Field trips in the 1920s and 1930s were tough assignments. Cranwell and her botanical companion Lucy Moore often slept out in the open in canvas sleeping bags, occasionally waking up covered in frost. Her field experience led her to be a conservationist recognising early that possums and wallabies represented a serious threat to the biodiversity of New Zealand forests. In 1940, Cranwell published The Botany of Auckland, the first definitive work of flora in the Auckland Region.

Palynology
During a trip to Europe, which included attending the International Botanical Congress in Amsterdam in 1935, she was invited by Professor Lennart von Post of Stockholm to learn his method of fossil pollen analysis. With knowledge of this new field study, palynology, Cranwell opened up a whole new field of botany in New Zealand. Her work analysing pollen taken from the sediment in bogs revealed the past botanical assemblages in New Zealand and aided an understanding of New Zealand's past as part of the supercontinent of Gondawana.

She was made a Fellow of the Linnaean Society (London) in November 1937, "in recognition of botanical research work done both in New Zealand and Sweden and because of efforts she has made to stimulate interest in botany through her position at the Auckland Museum." In the same year she won New Zealand's premier conservation award, the Loder Cup. She was awarded the Hector Medal from the Royal Society of New Zealand in 1954, the first woman ever to receive this honour.

War effort and marriage
Cranwell's war effort during World War II was to research to and prepare a booklet for downed allied airmen called "Food is Where You Find It: A Guide to Emergency Foods of the Western Pacific". It detailed, with illustrations, what  fish and foods the downed pilots with could eat. The booklet proved extremely popular and five facsimile impressions followed the initial print run of 5000 copies.

Cranwell married Captain (later Major) Samuel Watson Smith (1897–1993) of the 13th US Airforce, a lawyer and later eminent researcher in archaeology, in 1943 and moved to Arizona the United States in 1944. They had one son, Benjamin Watson Smith. After working at Harvard University Cranwell became a Research Affiliate in palynology at the University of Arizona, Tucson. She earned international recognition for her work in this field, particularly on Gondwanan plant microfossils. Even after moving to the United States, Cranwell remained strongly interested in New Zealand flora, becoming one of the first patrons of the Waitākere Ranges Protection Society in 1973.

Recognition 
Lucy May Cranwell Smith was elected as a Fellow of the Royal Society of New Zealand in 1944, and was the second woman to receive this award. In 1992, Cranwell was awarded an Honorary Doctor of Science by the University of Auckland.

In 2017, Cranwell was selected as one of the Royal Society Te Apārangi's "150 women in 150 words", celebrating the contributions of women to knowledge in New Zealand.

Legacy 
The New Zealand Association of Scientists Cranwell Medal is awarded to a practising scientist for excellence in communicating science to the general public in any area of science or technology. In 2017 this medal was renamed from the Science Communicator Medal to honour Cranwell, a remarkable communicator of science – in a time when this was essentially unheard of. The inaugural winner was the physicist Ocean Mercier.

Cranwell's childhood home in Henderson, which was bought by her father from Thomas Henderson, was donated to Waitakere City by the Cranwell family, and is now the location of Cranwell Park.

The New Zealand native grass species Festuca luciarum is named after both her and Lucy Moore. A tramping track at Anawhata on the west coast of the Waitākere Ranges, which Cranwell was a passionate advocate for, is named after Cranwell.

See also 
 Timeline of women in science

References

External links
 Information on an exhibit held at the Auckland Museum about Lucy Cranwell
 Lucy Cranwell - Pioneering young curator, adventurous and outstanding by Ewen K. Cameron, Auckland War Memorial Museum.

 

1907 births
2000 deaths
20th-century New Zealand botanists
University of Auckland alumni
People educated at Epsom Girls' Grammar School
20th-century New Zealand women scientists
People associated with the Auckland War Memorial Museum
New Zealand women botanists
New Zealand naturalists
New Zealand women curators